Clarence House, Richmond is a Grade II listed house in The Vineyard, Richmond, dating from about 1696.

It was built for Nathaniel Rawlins, a London haberdasher merchant, who lived there until his death in 1718. The Duke of Clarence, later to become King William IV, lived in Richmond in the late 1780s and gave his name to the property. From 1792 to 1799, Clarence House was a Catholic school run by Timothy Eeles. Among the students was Bernardo O'Higgins. O'Higgins is commemorated on the wall of the property with a blue plaque installed by English Heritage, for his role in the Chilean War of Independence.

The building was used as a warehouse by Fortnum & Mason from 1941 to 1947. They had planned in 1943 to tear the building down and replace it with a commercial development.

A private dwelling since 1947, it was owned by the actor Brian Blessed from 1967 to 1976. In 2012 the house was offered for sale, with an asking price of £22.5m. This was reduced to £18 million, and eventually to £14.5 million in 2013.

Notes

References

1690s establishments in England
Defunct Catholic schools in England
Fortnum & Mason
Grade II listed buildings in the London Borough of Richmond upon Thames
Grade II listed houses
History of the London Borough of Richmond upon Thames
Houses completed in the 17th century
Houses in the London Borough of Richmond upon Thames
Richmond, London
The Vineyard, Richmond